D-xylose reductase (XylR, XyrA, msXR, dsXR, monospecific xylose reductase, dual specific xylose reductase, NAD(P)H-dependent xylose reductase, xylose reductase) is an enzyme with systematic name xylitol:NAD(P)+ oxidoreductase. This enzyme catalyses the following chemical reaction

 xylitol + NAD(P)+  D-xylose + NAD(P)H + H+

Xylose reductase catalyses the initial reaction in the xylose utilization pathway, the NAD(P)H dependent reduction of xylose to xylitol.

References

External links 
 

EC 1.1.1